Aphomia euchelliellus is a species of snout moth in the genus Aphomia. It was described by Snellen, in 1900, and is known from Java in Indonesia.

References

Moths described in 1900
Tirathabini
Moths of Indonesia